Jacquez may refer to:
Jacquez, San Jose, barangay in the Philippines
Jacquez or Black Spanish (grape) American hybrid grape

People with the name Jacquez
Jacquez Green (born 1976), American former football player
Al Jacquez, original member, bassist and vocalist of Savage Grace (Michigan rock band)
Pat Jacquez (born 1947), American former baseball pitcher
Tom Jacquez (born 1975), American former baseball pitcher

See also
Jacques (disambiguation)
Jaquez, surname
Surnames from given names